Charles de Veber Schofield (14 July 1871 – 12 July 1936) was an eminent Anglican priest in the first half of the 20th century.

He was educated at Windsor, Nova Scotia and Edinburgh Theological College and ordained deacon in 1897 and priest in 1898. After a curacy at St Mary's, Portsea, Portsmouth he was Rector of Hampton, New Brunswick then Sydney, Nova Scotia. After this he was Dean of Fredericton (1907–1915) and then in 1916 Dean of Columbia, based in Victoria, British Columbia. A year later he became the Bishop of British Columbia, a position he held for twenty years. At some point, he became a Doctor of Divinity.

References

1876 births
Deans of Fredericton
Anglican bishops of British Columbia
20th-century Anglican Church of Canada bishops
1936 deaths
Alumni of Edinburgh Theological College